King Biscuit Flower Hour is a syndicated radio show.

King Biscuit Flower Hour may also refer to:

 King Biscuit Flower Hour (April Wine album), 1997
 King Biscuit Flower Hour (David Crosby album), 1996
 King Biscuit Flower Hour (Zebra album), 1999
 King Biscuit Flower Hour (In Concert), a 1996 album and DVD by Triumph

See also

King Biscuit Time